Thomas Nicholls ( – 24 March 1896) was an English sculptor.

Life and works
Nicholls was born in Westminster, London around the year 1825. In 1858, he began a long partnership with the architect William Burges, beginning with Burges's commission for the embellishment of Gayhurst House in Buckinghamshire for Lord Carrington. Nicholls went on to assist Burges in his first major commission, Saint Fin Barre's Cathedral, Cork subsequently following him to Cardiff, working on both Cardiff Castle and Castell Coch, the fantasy palaces Burges constructed for John Crichton-Stuart, 3rd Marquess of Bute.

Nicholls had two sons who followed him as sculptors, Thomas O. Nicholls (born c.1863) and Edward W. Nicholls (born c.1867).
Nicholls died at Clapham in 1896.

Notes

Sources
 

1820s births
1896 deaths
English male sculptors
People from Westminster
Sculptors from London